Indian bead is a colloquial American term for a fossilized stem segment of a columnal crinoid, a marine echinoderm of the class Crinoidea.  The fossils, generally a centimeter or less in diameter, tend to be cylindrical with a small hole (either open or filled) along the axis and can resemble unstrung beads.  The fossils are abundant in certain areas, including parts of the American Midwest where they are present in gravel.  They are sometimes also referred to as "Indian money".

The same item is known as Bonifatius pfennige in German ("Saint Boniface pennies") and St Cuthbert's beads in the United Kingdom.

Gallery

See also
St. Cuthbert's beads, name for identical bead in Great Britain

References

 Kentucky Geological Survey: Identifying Unknown Fossils (by their shape)

Fossil record of animals
Prehistoric crinoids

de:Seelilien und Haarsterne#Fossile Crinoiden